Wadborough is a small village 2 miles outside Pershore and 7 miles from Worcester. The village is in Worcestershire, England. The village is an old farming community, with its nearest church a mile away in Pirton.

In the 2001 census the parish of Drakes Broughton and Wadborough recorded a population of 1,762. Wadborough itself has approximately 200 inhabitants. Wadborough has one public house, the Masons Arms. The village has one bus service, the 382, which runs between Pershore and Worcester, once an hour in both directions.

History

Wadborough is first mentioned in the 10th century when King Edgar of England confirmed that four manses (priests houses) there belonged to Pershore Abbey. The Abbey owned most of the land in the area. Place names like Abbottswood and Hermitage Farm reflect a long church ownership. Wadborough appears in Domesday Book as Wadberge, meaning Old English wad "woad" beorg "hill". Woad dye production was usually carried out at some distance from towns (Wadborough is about four miles from Pershore) because of the offensive smells produced.

Wadborough railway station was situated west of the village on the Bristol to Birmingham main rail line. The line remains open and high-speed trains regularly pass through, but the station closed in January 1965.

References

Villages in Worcestershire
Wychavon